Donald H. Reed Jr. (born February 28, 1933) is an American politician who served as a Republican member for the 76th district of the Florida House of Representatives.

Reed was born in East Liverpool, Ohio, and moved to Florida in 1951. He earned a bachelor's degree at Ohio State University in 1957, and a law degree at the University of Florida in 1960. From 1963 he served as a member of the Florida House of Representatives. He was elected as the first representative for the newly-established 76th district in 1967, and succeeded by Chuck Nergard in 1972.

Reed served as the minority leader of the Florida House of Representatives from the 1960s to 1970s.

References 

1933 births
Living people
People from East Liverpool, Ohio
Republican Party members of the Florida House of Representatives
20th-century American politicians
Ohio State University alumni
University of Florida alumni